Jonathan Adid Núñez García (born 26 November 2001) is a Honduran professional footballer who plays as a midfielder for Motagua.

Career statistics

Club

Notes

References

Living people
2001 births
Honduran footballers
Honduras under-20 international footballers
Association football midfielders
Liga Nacional de Fútbol Profesional de Honduras players
F.C. Motagua players
Footballers at the 2020 Summer Olympics
Olympic footballers of Honduras
People from La Ceiba